Old Saybrook is a town in Middlesex County, Connecticut, United States. Its population was 10,481 at the 2020 census. It contains the incorporated borough of Fenwick, and the census-designated places of Old Saybrook Center and Saybrook Manor.

History

In 1624, shortly after establishing their first settlement at Governors Island, Dutch settlers established a short-lived factory at present-day Old Saybrook. The trading post was named Kievits Hoek, or "Plover's Corner". Kievits Hoek was soon abandoned as the Dutch consolidated settlement at New Amsterdam. In 1633, Fort Goede Hoop (Huys de Goede Hoop), was established at present-day Hartford.

The Pequot siege of Saybrook Fort took place from September 1636 to March 1637 during the Pequot War.

Following the August 1636 Massachusetts Bay attack on Manisses, Pequot, and Western Niantic villages, the Pequot retaliation fell on the settlers at Saybrook.  During an eight-month time, the Pequot killed and wounded more than 20 settlers at and near Saybrook Fort. The settlers were attacked when they ventured far from their palisade, and the Pequot destroyed their provisions and burned warehouses while they attempted to interrupt river traffic to Windsor, Wethersfield, and Hartford.
During the Siege and Battle of Saybrook Fort, the Pequot and New England colonists assessed each other's military capabilities, and adjusted countertactics. Each side's tactical modifications show a high degree of sophistication, planning, and ingenuity.  Lessons learned during the siege of Saybrook escalated the Pequot War in Connecticut Colony, and indirectly resulted in the attack and destruction of Mistick Fort (May 1637).

The Saybrook Colony was established in late 1635 at the mouth of the Connecticut River, in what is today Old Saybrook and environs.  John Winthrop, the Younger, son of the Governor of the Massachusetts Bay Colony, was designated governor by the group that claimed possession of the land via a deed of conveyance from Robert Rich, 2nd Earl of Warwick. Winthrop was aided by Colonel George Fenwick and Captain Lion Gardiner. As the principals of the group who had planned to settle the colony were supporters of Oliver Cromwell and remained in England during the English Civil War, the colony struggled. In 1644, Fenwick agreed to merge the colony with the more vibrant Connecticut Colony a few miles upriver, which purchased the land and fort from him.

The design of the Flag of Connecticut comes from the seal of Saybrook Colony. The seal was brought from England by Colonel George Fenwick, and depicted 15 grapevines and a hand in the upper left corner with a scroll reading "Qui Transtulit Sustinet", "He who transplanted sustains".

In 1647 Major John Mason assumed command of Saybrook (Colony) Fort, which controlled the main trade and supply route to the upper river valley. The fort promptly and mysteriously burned to the ground, but another improved fort was quickly built nearby on the Battery Mound. He spent the next 12 years there and also served as commissioner of the United Colonies, the chief military officer, magistrate, and peacekeeper. In 1659, almost all settlers from Saybrook under the leadership of Mason, purchased land from Uncas, sachem of the Mohegan tribe, removed to and founded Norwich, Connecticut.  This second fort was eventually abandoned after 200 years and the battery mound remained until 1871, when the Valley Railroad leveled it and other hills on the point to provide needed fill for their tracks across the north and south coves.

In 1661, a witch trial was held of Saybrook residents Margaret Jennings and her husband Nicholas, who were accused of causing the deaths of Marie Marvin and others. The trial resulted in a finding that they were probably witches, but the proof was not sufficient to execute them.

On October 9, 1701, the Collegiate School of Connecticut was chartered in Old Saybrook. It moved to New Haven in 1716, and was later renamed Yale University.

Turtle—the first American submarine—was invented in Westbrook, Connecticut, in 1775 by David Bushnell; a replica is housed at the Connecticut River Museum in Essex. 

The General Assembly created the separate town of Old Saybrook from Saybrook in 1852. Old Saybrook was partitioned again in 1854, when the northern part became the town of Essex.

A 1964 meeting at Old Saybrook, the First Invitational Conference on Humanistic Psychology, was key to the early development of humanistic psychology. Saybrook University in California, established in 1971, is named after the conference.

Later development 

In early 2007, plans were established to return the former town hall building to its original use as a theater. The theater was completed in 2009 and is named the "Katharine Hepburn Cultural Arts Center and Theater".

The town has committed spending almost $2 million on the renovation, and at least $810,000 were to be contributed by the state. A committee was attempting to raise another $2.5 million, partly for the renovation and to add two wings, but also for an endowment. The structure was originally built in 1901, and was a theater until the 1940s. After renovations, the theater was to seat 250, and Hepburn memorabilia would be displayed there.

Geography
According to the United States Census Bureau, the town has a total area of 21.6 square miles (56.0 km), of which 6.6 sq mi (17.0 km) (30.45%) are covered by water.

Principal communities
Chalker Beach
Cornfield Point
District of Fencove
Borough of Fenwick
District of Fenwood
Indian Town
Knollwood
Old Saybrook Center (includes Saybrook Point)
District of Otter Cove
Saybrook Manor
North Cove

Flora

Coastal Connecticut (including Old Saybrook) is the broad transition zone where  so-called "subtropical indicator" plants and other broadleaf evergreens can successfully be cultivated. Old Saybrook averages about 90 days annually with freeze (temperatures of 32°F/0°C) – about the same as Baltimore, Maryland, or Albuquerque, New Mexico, for example. As such, southern magnolias, needle palms, windmill palms, loblolly pines, and crape myrtles are grown in private and public gardens.

Education

Old Saybrook is home to a district educational system. Kathleen E. Goodwin School is for prekindergarten through grade 4, Old Saybrook Middle School is for grades 5 through 8, and Old Saybrook Senior High School is for grades 9 through 12. The high school competes in the Shoreline Conference. In 2018 and 2019, the boys' soccer team won back-to-back state championships.

Old Saybrook is also home to prekindergarten through grade 8 at St John's Catholic School, and toddler–grade 6 at the Children's Tree Montessori School. The town also has a number of students who attend private schools, including nearby parochial schools such as Xavier High School and Mercy High School.

Demographics

2010 U.S. Census

As of the 2010 census, 10,242 people, 4,247 households, and 2,923 families were living in the town; 1,108 households had children under 18. The racial makeup of the town was 93.9% White, 0.9% African American, 0.1% Native American, 2.4% Asian, 1.2% from other races, and 1.5% from two or more races. Hispanics or Latinos of any race were 3.3% of the population.

Of the 4,247 households, 23.7% had children under 18 living with them, 56.2% were married couples living together, 7.5% had a female householder with no husband present, and 33.2% were not families. About 28.9% of households were one person and 14.6% were one person 65 or older. The average household size was 2.21, and the average family size was 2.71.

The age distribution was 21.4% under 20, 3.4% from 20 to 24, 16.4% from 25 to 44, 33.5% from 45 to 64, and 25.3% 65 or older. The median age was 50.1 years. The population consisted of 4,852 (47.4%) males and 5,390 (52.6%) females.

The median household income was $80,347 and the median family income  was $97,399. Males had a median income of $74,298 versus $49,913 for females. The per capita income for the town was $43,266. About 4.5% of families and 5.9% of the population were below the poverty line, including 6.0% of those under age 18 and 4.3% of those age 65 or over.

2000 U.S. Census

At the 2000 census,  10,367 people, 4,184 households, and 2,920 families resided in the town. The racial makeup of the town was 95.75% White, 1.01% African American, 0.08% Native American, 1.72% Asian, 0.07% Pacific Islander, 0.45% from other races, and 0.93% from two or more races. Hispanics or Latinos of any race were 1.87% of the population.

Of the 4,184 households, 27.2% had children under 18 living with them, 59.4% were married couples living together, 7.6% had a female householder with no husband present, and 30.2% were not families. About 25.4% of households were one person, and 12.9% were one person 65 or older. The average household size was 2.41, and the average family size was 2.90.

The age distribution was 21.7% under the age of 18, 4.1% from 18 to 24, 25.2% from 25 to 44, 27.6% from 45 to 64, and 21.5% 65 or older. The median age was 44 years. For every 100 females, there were 89.5 males. For every 100 females age 18 and over, there were 86.3 males.

The median household income was $62,742 and the median family income  was $72,868. Males had a median income of $48,527 versus $36,426 for females. The per capita income for the town was $30,720. About 1.5% of families and 4.5% of the population were below the poverty line, including 1.9% of those under age 18 and 9.7% of those age 65 or over.

Transportation

Old Saybrook's train station opened in 1873 and was rebuilt in 2002. Amtrak, the national rail passenger system, provides daily service along the Northeast Corridor to Boston, New York, and points south. The high-speed Acela Express passes through Old Saybrook, but does not stop; service is provided by the conventional Northeast Regional. The Connecticut Department of Transportation provides regular commuter service to New Haven, New London, and Stamford via the Shore Line East, and connecting service to the MetroNorth Railroad, which runs to Grand Central Terminal in Manhattan.

The Estuary Transit District provides public transportation services throughout Old Saybrook and the surrounding towns through its 9 Town transit services.

Old Saybrook is served by two freeways that intersect within the town's borders.  Interstate 95 runs across the town from west to east (though it is signed north–south), and connects Old Saybrook to New Haven and New London along the Connecticut shoreline.  Connecticut Route 9 has its southern terminus at I-95, and extends to the northwest to ultimately reach Middletown and Hartford.

Media
One radio station is licensed to Old Saybrook: WLIS AM 1420 (variety). The town is also covered by Shore Publishing and the local newspaper the Harbor News.

National Register of Historic Places in Old Saybrook
Black Horse Tavern, added December 1, 1978
Elisha Bushnell House, added November 29, 1978
Connecticut Valley Railroad Roundhouse and Turntable Site, added April 28, 1994
Jedidiah Dudley House, added April 12, 1982
Samuel Eliot House, added November 9, 1972
General William Hart House, added November 9, 1972
James Pharmacy, added August 5, 1994
Lynde Point Lighthouse, added May 29, 1990
Old Saybrook South Green, added September 3, 1976
Parker House, added November 29, 1978
Humphrey Pratt Tavern, added November 7, 1972
Saybrook Breakwater Lighthouse, added May 29, 1990
William Tully House, added March 15, 1982
Ambrose Whittlesey House, added August 23, 1985
John Whittlesey Jr. House, added October 26, 1984

Notable people

 Vin Baker (born 1971), professional basketball player in the NBA (1993–2006)
 Virginia Biddle (1910–2003), American revue performer and showgirl
 Lion Gardiner (1599–1663)
 Katharine Hepburn (1907–2003), four-time Academy Award-winning actress and Hollywood legend, lived in the borough of Fenwick 
 John Clellon Holmes (1926–1988), writer and poet associated with the "Beat Generation"
 Anna Louise James (1886–1977), first female African American pharmacist in Connecticut
 Ann Petry (1908–1997), novelist, journalist, and biographer
 Maria Sanford (1836–1920), American educator and professor at Swarthmore College and University of Minnesota
 Elmer Eric Schattschneider (1892–1971), prominent political scientist and former president of the American Political Science Association
 Simon Willard (1605–1676)

Image gallery

See also

 Saybrook, Illinois, is named in honor of Old Saybrook.
 Saybrook College, Yale University is named after the town.
 Saybrook University is named in honor of a 1964 psychology conference that took place in the town.

References

External links

 
Town government Web site
Old Saybrook Historical Society
History of Old Saybrook at the Old Saybrook Historical Society

 
Towns in Middlesex County, Connecticut
Connecticut populated places on the Connecticut River
Towns in Connecticut
Populated coastal places in Connecticut
Greater Hartford
1624 establishments in the Dutch Empire
Populated places established in 1624